The 1996–97 Courage League National Division Two was the tenth full season of rugby union within the second tier of the English league system, currently known as the RFU Championship and was season that saw professional rugby openly introduced into the English game.  Joining the eight teams who participated in the division in 1995–96 were Richmond, Coventry, Rugby and Rotherham all of whom were promoted from National Division Three with no teams coming down from National Division One due to league restructuring.  The league was sponsored by Courage Brewery for the tenth consecutive year.

The top two teams, Richmond and Newcastle Falcons were automatically promoted, and for the first time there were play–offs between the third and fourth placed teams, and the ninth and tenth placed teams in Division One, for a place in the top tier for season 1997-98. The Division Two sides played at home first with the winners of the two matches, on aggregate score, playing in the top division the following season. Coventry and Bedford both failed to win promotion. Rugby Lions and Nottingham were relegated to Division 3 for the 1997–98 season. Last season Nottingham finished in the bottom two and escaped relegation due to the division being increased from ten clubs to twelve clubs. This season they were not so lucky and next season will be their first in Division Three.

Participating teams

Table

Promotion play–offs
For the first time play–offs took place between the third and fourth placed teams in Division Two and the ninth and tenth placed teams in Division One. The play–offs followed a 4th v 9th, 3rd v 10th system - with the games being played over two legs and the second tier team playing at home in the first leg.

First leg

Second leg

 Bristol won 39 – 23 on aggregate to retain their place in Division One

 London Irish won 42 – 23 on aggregate to retain their place in Division One

Individual statistics 

 Note that points scorers includes tries as well as conversions, penalties and drop goals.

Top points scorers

Top try scorers

Season records

Team
Largest home win — 151 pts
156 - 5 Newcastle Falcons at home to Rugby Lions on 5 October 1996
Largest away win — 72 pts
87 - 15 Richmond away to Moseley on 5 October 1996
Most points scored — 151 pts
156 - 5 Newcastle Falcons at home to Rugby Lions on 5 October 1996
Most tries in a match — 24
Newcastle Falcons at home to Rugby Lions on 5 October 1996
Most conversions in a match — 18
Newcastle Falcons at home to Rugby Lions on 5 October 1996
Most penalties in a match — 7
Rotherham away to Richmond on 14 September 1996
Most drop goals in a match — 2 (x3)
Coventry at home to Wakefield on 21 September 1996
London Scottish away to Blackheath on 8 February 1997
Blackheath at home to Nottingham on 22 March 1997

Player
Most points in a match — 42
 Jez Harris for Coventry at home to Nottingham on 5 October 1996
Most tries in a match — 5
 Pat Lam for Newcastle Falcons at home to Rotherham on 4 May 1997
Most conversions in a match — 18
 Rob Andrew for Newcastle Falcons at home to Rugby Lions on 5 October 1996
Most penalties in a match —  7
 Matt Inman for Rotherham away to Richmond on 14 September 1996
Most drop goals in a match —  2 (x2)
 Jez Harris for Coventry at home to Wakefield on 21 September 1996
 Chris Braithwaite for Blackheath at home to Nottingham on 22 March 1997

Attendances

Note that attendances were very poorly documented this season and aside from a few big games there is almost no information available

Highest — 8,000
Coventry at home to Newcastle Falcons on 2 November 1996
Lowest — N/A
N/A
Highest Average Attendance — N/A
N/A
Lowest Average Attendance — N/A
N/A

See also
 English rugby union system

References

N2
RFU Championship seasons